The Ministry of Finance is the ministry responsible for handling Qatar's public finances.

Ministers
Sheikh Khalifa bin Hamad Al Thani, 1960–1972
Sheikh Abdelaziz bin Khalifa Al Thani, 1972-1992
Abdullah bin Hamad Al Attiyah, 1992-1995
Sheikh Mohammed bin Khalifa Al Thani, 1995-1998
Yousef Hussain Kamal Al Emadi, 1998-2013
Ali Sharif Al Emadi, 2013-2021
Ali bin Ahmed al Kuwari 2021-present

See also
Politics of Qatar
Economy of Qatar

References

Government ministries of Qatar
Qatar
Qatar, Finance
1960 establishments in Qatar
Economy of Qatar